Moncassin is a commune in the Gers department in southwestern France.

Geography

The Petite Baïse flows north through the middle of the commune and forms parts of its northern border.

Population

See also
Communes of the Gers department

References

Communes of Gers